Shamsabad (also Romanized as Shamsābād) is a village in Tus Rural District, in the Central District of Mashhad County, Razavi Khorasan Province, Iran. At the 2006 census, its population was 184, in 53 families.

References 

Populated places in Mashhad County